Steve Kettner (born 7 May 1969) is an Australian former weightlifter. He competed at the 1992 Summer Olympics and the 1996 Summer Olympics.

References

External links
 

1969 births
Living people
Australian male weightlifters
Olympic weightlifters of Australia
Weightlifters at the 1992 Summer Olympics
Weightlifters at the 1996 Summer Olympics
Sportspeople from Albury
Commonwealth Games medallists in weightlifting
Commonwealth Games gold medallists for Australia
Commonwealth Games silver medallists for Australia
Commonwealth Games bronze medallists for Australia
Weightlifters at the 1990 Commonwealth Games
Weightlifters at the 1994 Commonwealth Games
Sportsmen from New South Wales
20th-century Australian people
21st-century Australian people
Medallists at the 1990 Commonwealth Games
Medallists at the 1994 Commonwealth Games